The Ulster Institute for the Deaf (UID) was a Northern Ireland charity based in Belfast to support the Deaf Community in Ulster.  In 1991 it merged into the Royal National Institute for the Deaf, now Action on Hearing Loss.

It was originally an educational institution at Fisherwick Place, Belfast, where Francis Maginn (1861 – 1918), one of the founders of the British Deaf Association was its first superintendent.

References

External links 
 The Ulster Institute For The Deaf, Dumb And Blind 1897, Belfast, photograph

Charities based in Northern Ireland
Medical and health organisations based in Northern Ireland
Deafness charities
Deaf culture in the United Kingdom